The Infinite Wonders of Creation is the third and final album in a trilogy by Luca Turilli's eponymous band. The album was released in Europe on 26 May 2006 and was later released in USA on 6 June 2006 by Magic Circle Music.

A Limited Version of the album was released and contains a piano version of the song "Altitudes" and a single CD with the Luca Turilli's Dreamquest song "Virus" (The single CD also includes a remix of "Virus", along with the tracks "Too Late" and "Sospiro Divino".) This album is notable for the addition of much more use of a female voice done by Bridget Fogle, and for being the only Luca Turilli album with Turilli on keyboards. The male voices were done, as on all of his earlier albums, by Olaf Hayer.

Track listing

Lineup
Bridget Fogle – female lead vocals
Olaf Hayer – male lead vocals
Luca Turilli – guitars, keyboards, composer
Sascha Paeth – bass
Robert Hunecke-Rizzo – drums

Charts

References

External links
Luca Turilli's Web Site
Magic Circle Music Web Site

Luca Turilli albums
2006 albums